Importation Act may refer to:

 Importation Act 1337, an act of the Parliament of England prohibiting the importation of foreign made cloth
 Importation Act 1455, an act of the Parliament of England prohibiting the importation of items sold by silkwomen
 Importation Act 1463, an act of the Parliament of England to support domestic British corn prices
 Importation Act 1482, an act of the Parliament of England prohibiting the importation of foreign made silk
 Importation Act 1562, an act of the Parliament of England prohibiting the importation of manufactured goods used in military equipment
 Importation Act 1666, an act of the Parliament of England prohibiting the importation of Irish cattle
 Importation Act 1667, an act of the Parliament of England which banned Irish cattle from being sold in England
 Importation Act 1685, an act of the Parliament of England repealing the Prohibition of 1678 which banned the import of French commodities
 Importation Act 1815, a tariff designed to support domestic British corn prices against competition from less expensive foreign-grain imports
 Importation Act 1822, an act of the Parliament of England to support domestic British corn prices
 Importation Act 1846, a repeal of Importation Act 1815 (Corn Laws)
 Act Prohibiting Importation of Slaves (1807), a United States federal law that stated that no new slaves were permitted to be imported into the United States

See also
 Non-importation Act